Tough Crowd with Colin Quinn is a comedic talk show which aired on Comedy Central from 2002 to 2004.  The show featured host Colin Quinn and a panel of comedian guests, discussing politics, current events, and social issues.

Show history and format
In 2002, comedian Colin Quinn was given his own show on NBC, titled The Colin Quinn Show, which was broadcast live from the Saturday Night Live soundstage in New York City. The show only lasted for three episodes. Each of these three episodes aired on successive Mondays from March 11, 2002 to March 25, 2002.

Although NBC chose not to continue with the show, Quinn took a similarly-themed show to Comedy Central later on that year.  On December 9, 2002, Tough Crowd With Colin Quinn debuted on Comedy Central with an eight-episode test series, which ran Mondays through Thursdays, until December 19, 2002.  The show was picked up in January 2003, and the regular series began its 21-week run on March 10, 2003.  The show aired weeknights at 11:30 p.m. ET, immediately following The Daily Show with Jon Stewart.

The show was presented as an alternative, unpolished and more accessible political "round-table" discussion/shouting-match program in the manner of CNN's Crossfire, taking cue from Bill Maher's Politically Incorrect. The guests on the panel were usually comedians who had been given topics in advance on which to prepare material. Quinn's regular guests consisted mainly of Comedy Central affiliated comedians from the Comedy Cellar comedy club in New York City.  The club was renowned for its postperformance roundtable discussions with comedians in the audience about political issues. These exchanges were the inspiration for Tough Crowd.

The show would open with a monologue by Quinn.  Quinn would then stand in front of a pool table, or sit on the edge of it, very often sipping coffee, eating or perusing through a newspaper.  Usually, there were four comedians as guests, however, in some episodes there were five comedians, and on very rare occasions, only three comedians.  On the episodes which featured five comedians, four of them would be seated in chairs, as was the normal fashion, while the fifth comedian would sit off to the side, on a bench.  Whenever one of the four in the chairs told a joke that didn't get a laugh, Quinn would banish that comedian over to the bench, and replace him with the person who was previously on the bench.  Quinn would introduce current events that were going on in the news, and would moderate (or attempt to moderate, sometimes futilely) the discussion.  Most of the show was the comedians discussing these topics.  Near the end of each episode, there was usually a sketch of some sort, followed by each of the guests doing a brief monologue on a particular topic that was discussed earlier in the episode.

Many of the comedians were also close friends, and mutually making fun of each other was a large part of the show. Part of Quinn's highly unusual approach was not to edit out jokes which fell flat, often leading to uncomfortable pauses, which were enjoyed by fans of the Cringe comedy style, but which may have appeared awkward to the mainstream television audience. Quinn also reprimanded guests who attempted to gain cheap applause from the audience.  For example, if a comedian made a general blanket statement which wasn't particularly funny, but elicited applause nonetheless, Quinn would berate the comedian for being sanctimonious and pandering. One of the show's running jokes, which occurred in numerous episodes, was that at some point, one of the comedians would insult Quinn over what he was wearing.  Very often, the comedians would also insult each other over clothing choices, hairstyles or weight issues.  Said Quinn of Tough Crowd'''s comparisons to Politically Incorrect:  "It was a role model for our show. But on my show, we’re all comedians. No experts. We’re not as high-minded. If we don’t agree with someone, we just make fun of their shirt."

The show featured comedians with all ranges of political viewpoints, be they liberal, (such as Marc Maron), conservative, (such as Quinn and Nick DiPaolo) or moderate, (such as Jim Norton and Greg Giraldo).  Tough Crowd did well in the ratings and gained a loyal following; however, Quinn was forced to battle network executives over content issues.  The show was placed on an "indefinite hiatus" in October 2004, with what was presumably its final episode airing the Thursday following Election Day in 2004.  DiPaolo, Norton and other Tough Crowd alums would later make semi-regular appearances on Fox News' Red Eye with Greg Gutfeld, which was a similarly-themed comedic panel show, albeit with a predominantly conservative angle.

Regular guests
The show featured many different comedians, including legends such as George Carlin and Jerry Seinfeld, but the core group that was regularly rotated into the show's panels and often paired together was:

 Nick DiPaolo
 Greg Giraldo
 Jim Norton
 Patrice O'Neal
 Rich Vos
 Keith Robinson
 Judy Gold

On September 26, 2003, Comedy Central aired an hour-long Tough Crowd themed stand-up comedy special called Tough Crowd Stands Up hosted by Quinn and featuring stand-up sets from the show's 5 regulars: DiPaolo, Giraldo, Norton, O'Neal, and Vos.

Episodes
Some episodes and guest lineups are missing, and many specific dates are unknown.

Series finale and epilogue
Jim Norton addressed the program's demise on his blog, where he mentioned that Comedy Central would send down notes to the show discouraging the predominant focus on political topics and discussions about race and ethnic issues. The network claimed this was only because they already had scripted/talk programming that addressed these issues, referring to The Daily Show with Jon Stewart and Chappelle's Show, and warned that some of the views expressed on Tough Crowd did not appeal to the demographics at which Comedy Central's current business model was aimed.

The last show contained emotional monologues by Quinn, who attacked his detractors (such as The New York Times'') as being hypocritical and elitist for their negative reviews. He also defined "comedic integrity" as the ability to critique the hypocrisy of society, but to be honest enough to admit that you are just as guilty of it as anyone else. The implication was that many political comedians spend all their time criticizing society and others, but rarely themselves.

References

External links
 
 "Laurie Kilmartin's experience as a writer for Tough Crowd" by Laurie Kilmartin, November 9, 2004

Comedy Central late-night programming
2000s American television talk shows
2000s American late-night television series
2002 American television series debuts
2004 American television series endings
Comedy Central original programming